Watchhouse (formerly Mandolin Orange) is an Americana/folk duo based in Chapel Hill, North Carolina. The group was formed in 2009 in Chapel Hill, North Carolina and consists of songwriter Andrew Marlin (vocals, mandolin, guitar, banjo) and Emily Frantz (vocals, violin, guitar), who are married to each other. Watchhouse has produced six albums of Marlin's original works of American roots music. In the last three years, the group has toured throughout the U.S and Europe, including appearances at Austin City Limits, South by Southwest, Edmonton Folk Music Festival, Telluride Bluegrass Festival, Newport Folk Festival, Pickathon, Hardly Strictly Bluegrass, Rooster Walk, and MerleFest and the Omagh Bluegrass Festival. Watchhouse was the featured artist on CBS This Morning 's Saturday Morning Sessions on December 7, 2019.'They signed to Yep Roc Records in 2013 and have produced four albums under their umbrella, This Side of Jordan, Such Jubilee, Blindfaller and Tides of a Teardrop.

During the COVID-19 pandemic, Marlin recorded two instrumental albums without Frantz, Witching Hour and Fable & Fire. In April 2021, the band announced that moving forward, they would change the group's name from Mandolin Orange to Watchhouse. Of the change, Marlin said "Mandolin Orange was born out of my 21-year-old mind. The name isn't what I strive for when I write" and that Watchhouse'' is a name that reflects their "true intentions" as a band.

In 2021 the band was part of the Newport Folk Festival in July.

Discography

Albums

References

External links 
 

American folk musical groups
Musical groups from Chapel Hill-Carrboro, North Carolina
American musical duos
Musical groups established in 2009
2009 establishments in North Carolina